The 1947 Italian presidential election was undertaken to elect a provisional head of the Italian State.

Background
Enrico De Nicola submitted his resignation on 25 June 1947, officially for health reasons, but also to regain legitimacy after the annual term of the Constituent Assembly of Italy, to which even his term was tied, had expired.

Enrico De Nicola, however, was still re-elected as Provisional Head of State on 26 June 1947. From 1 January 1948 he assumed the title of President of the Italian Republic in accordance with the first final provision of the Constitution of Italy.

Result

References

Presidential elections in Italy